1-800 Dinosaur is a British record label founded by James Blake. Their first release was in 2016.

References

British record labels